Michael Chadwick Tindall (5 April 1941 – 10 August 2020) was an English professional footballer who was born in Birmingham and is best known for his career with Aston Villa. His playing position was wing-half.

Club career
After Villa, he moved to Walsall briefly before dropping into the non-League to play for Tamworth. He also played in the United States for the New York Americans.

International career
Tindall played for the England youth team but never represented the senior side.

Later life and death
Tindall died in August 2020 following a battle with dementia.

References

English footballers
1941 births
2020 deaths
Walsall F.C. players
Aston Villa F.C. players
Tamworth F.C. players
Association football midfielders
English Football League players
New York Americans (soccer) (1933–1956) players
English expatriate footballers
English expatriates in the United States
Expatriate soccer players in the United States
England youth international footballers
Deaths from dementia in the United Kingdom